Fare zone 6 is an outer zone of Transport for London's zonal fare system used for calculating the price of tickets for travel on the London Underground, London Overground, Docklands Light Railway, National Rail services (since 2007), and the Elizabeth line within Greater London. The zone was created in January 1991; previously it had formed part of zone 5 since May 1983.

List of stations

The following stations are within zone 6:

Changes
January 1991: zone 6 created from part of zone 5
January 1997: Debden, Theydon Bois and Epping from outside the zones to zone 6 and Moor Park from zone A to zone 6/A boundary
January 2005: Cheam and Belmont from zone 6 to zone 5
January 2006: Whyteleafe, Whyteleafe South, Caterham, Banstead, Epsom Downs, Tattenham Corner, Tadworth, Kingswood, Chipstead and Upper Warlingham from outside the zones to zone 6
January 2007: Stoneleigh from zone 6 to zone 5 and Ewell East & Ewell West from outside the zones to zone 6

See also

References